Stratonicus may refer to:

Stratonicus of Athens, musician famous for his sharp wit
Stratonicus (saint), saint of the Eastern Orthodox Church, see September 30 (Eastern Orthodox liturgics)